The Autorité de Régulation des Communications Électroniques et des Postes (ARCEP) is an independent agency in charge of regulating telecommunications and postal services in Gabon.

References

External links 
 

Government  of Gabon

Mass media regulation